The Ministry of Foreign and European Affairs is responsible for maintaining the Slovak Republic's external relations and the management of its international diplomatic missions. The ministry's director is Rastislav Káčer.

History
After the peaceful dissolution of the former Czechoslovakia in 1993, Slovakia became an independent nation and has maintained official diplomatic relations with other nations since then. Between 2009-2010 and 2012-2020, Miroslav Lajčák has been the foreign minister.

Diplomacy
The ministry oversees Slovakia's affairs with foreign entities, including bilateral relations with individual nations and its representation in international organizations, including the European Union, the United Nations, NATO and the OECD. The ministry also holds responsibility for matters related to international trade, the rights of its expatriates, monitoring human rights and crisis situations abroad, and the spread of information about Slovakia internationally. The ministry is also involved in the affairs of the Visegrád Group (V4), a grouping of Central European states—Slovakia, the Czech Republic, Hungary and Poland—established for the purpose of furthering the four nations' European integration.

See also
 Minister of Foreign Affairs (Slovakia)
 List of diplomatic missions of Slovakia

References

External links
 Official Ministry website

Slovakia
Government of Slovakia